Bragdon may refer to:

Surname:
Claude Fayette Bragdon (1866–1946), American architect, writer and stage designer
David Bragdon (born 1959), United States politician from Oregon
John Stewart Bragdon (1893–1964), United States Army major
Jonathan Bragdon, contemporary American landscape artist
Richard Bragdon, Canadian politician from New Brunswick
Peter Bragdon, United States politician from New Hampshire
Tarren Bragdon (born 1975), American former state legislator and think tank founder

Location:
Bragdon Formation, geologic formation in California
Bragdon Hall, Reed College hall of residence
Bragdon-Lipe House, historic home at Canajoharie, Montgomery County, New York
Bragdon Wood, key fictional location in the novel That Hideous Strength by C. S. Lewis

It may also refer to:
 Bragdon v. Abbott, a Supreme Court of the United States case involving the Americans with Disabilities Act of 1990